Pielenhofen is a municipality in the district of Regensburg in Bavaria in Germany. It lies on the Naab River.

Buildings
It is the site of Pielenhofen Abbey, formerly a Cistercian nunnery, now a house and school of the Visitandines.

References

Regensburg (district)